Balsamorhiza sagittata is a North American species of flowering plant in the tribe Heliantheae of the family Asteraceae known by the common name Arrowleaf Balsamroot. It is widespread across western Canada and much of the western United States.

Description

The silvery-gray basal leaves are generally triangular in shape and large, approaching  in maximum length. Leaves farther up the stem are linear to narrowly oval in shape and smaller. The leaves have untoothed edges and are coated in fine to rough hairs, especially on the undersides.

The inflorescence bears one or more flower head, sometimes more than one on the same stem, blooming from May to July.

B. deltoidea is similar but is greener, less hairy, and does not retain its ray flowers for long.

Distribution and habitat

The plant's native range extends from British Columbia and Alberta in the north, southward as far as northern Arizona and the Mojave Desert of California, and as far east as the Black Hills of South Dakota. It grows in many types of habitat from mountain forests to grassland to desert scrub. It is drought tolerant.

Ecology
The species hybridizes with Balsamorhiza hookeri.

Grazing animals find the plant palatable, especially the flowers and developing seed heads. Elk and deer browse the leaves.

Uses
Coming into season in late spring, all of the plant can be eaten—particularly the leaves (raw or cooked), roots (cooked), and the seeds, raw or pounded into flour. It can be bitter and pine-like in taste. The leaves are best collected when young and can carry a citrus flavor.

Many Native American groups, including the Nez Perce, Kootenai, Cheyenne, and Salish, utilized the plant as a food and medicine. The seeds were particularly valuable as food or used for oil. In 1806, William Clark collected a specimen near the White Salmon River, and both he and Frederick Pursh noted that the stem was eaten raw by the American natives.

Culture 
A specimen was collected by explorer and botanist Meriwether Lewis near Lewis and Clark Pass in 1806.

Under the name Okanagan Sunflower, it is the official flower emblem of the city of Kelowna, British Columbia, Canada.

Gallery

References

External links

 
 Northern Bushcraft: Identification and edible parts of Balsamorhiza sagittata.
 

sagittata
Plants described in 1840
Plants used in Native American cuisine
Plants used in traditional Native American medicine
Kelowna
Flora of Western Canada
Flora of the Northwestern United States
Flora of the Southwestern United States
Flora of the North-Central United States
Flora without expected TNC conservation status